"Twist It" is a 2005 song by Olivia featuring Lloyd Banks

"Twist It", song by Eve's Plum
"Twist It", song by The John Barry Seven written by John Barry 1961

See also
"Twist It Up", No. 25 single 1963 Twist (dance) by Chubby Checker